Lobos de Tierra is a Peruvian island situated 19 km from the mainland close to the Illescas Peninsula and the boundary between the departments of Piura and Lambayeque regions. Its area is 16 km2, its approximate length is 10 km, and its approximate width is 3 km.

Natural resources
In 1863 the island was estimated to have guano deposits of almost 7 million metric tons, which were then exploited without any control. The number proved to be an overestimate and today that wealth has almost disappeared and the little remaining guano does not have the same quality as before.

The climate of this island is very warm and is home to birds like kelp gulls, boobies (Blue-footed, Nazca, and Peruvian), and Guanay cormorants. The last two species were of great importance during the heyday of guano. Lobos de Tierra Island owes its name to its proximity to the coast and the presence of otariids.  At times blue whales can be seen.

Geography
Around the island there are several islets such as El León and Albatros.

See also
List of islands of Peru

References

External links
 Geographic information on geonames.org

Uninhabited islands of Peru
Pacific islands of Peru